Yangcun railway station is a railway station on the Beijing-Shanghai Railway in Wuqing District, Tianjin, China.

The station building is to the north of the platforms and features a ticketing and waiting hall.

See also
Yangcun Railway Station is 5 km away from Wuqing railway station on the Beijing-Tianjin Intercity Railway.

Railway stations in Tianjin
Stations on the Beijing–Shanghai Railway